Davydkovo is a rural locality (a village) in Belosludskoye Rural Settlement of Krasnoborsky District, Arkhangelsk Oblast, Russia. The population was 2 as of 2010.

Geography 
Davydkovo is located 16 km northeast of Krasnoborsk (the district's administrative centre) by road. Izosimovo is the nearest rural locality.

References 

Rural localities in Krasnoborsky District